Amblispa laevigata, is a species of leaf beetle found in Bangladesh, India, Nepal, and Sri Lanka.

Host plants are grasses.

References 

Cassidinae
Insects of Sri Lanka
Beetles described in 1844